The Regius Professor of English Literature is a Regius Professorship at the University of Aberdeen in Scotland. The first holder was appointed in 1894.

List of Regius Professors of English Literature

 Herbert Grierson (1894 to 1915); first incumbent
 Adolphus Alfred Jack (1915 to 1938)
 Geoffrey Bickersteth (1938 to 1954)
 G. I. Duthie (1955 to 1967)
 Andrew Rutherford (1968 to 1984)
 R. P. Draper (1987 to 1994)
 George Rousseau (1994 to 1998)
 Peter Robert Keith Andrew Davidson (1998 to 2005)

References

Professorships at the University of Aberdeen
English Literature Aberdeen Regius Professorship
Professorships in literature